is a Tendai sect Buddhist temple in Hiraizumi in southern Iwate Prefecture in the Tōhoku region of Japan. Its main image is a stone image of Bishamon-ten. The grounds have been designated a National Historic Site since 2005

Overview
Takkoku no Iwaya is located approximately six kilometers southwest of Hiraizumi, between the center of town and Genbikei ravine. The temple is built below an overhanging cliff, and incorporates a shallow cave containing a bas-relief statue of Bishamon-ten. In the Heian period, a large statue of Fudō Myōō (designated an Iwate Prefectural Cultural Property) and a bas-relief image of Buddha carved into the rock face were added. 

The temple claims to have been founded by the Yamato Chinjufu-shōgun Sakanoue no Tamuramaro in 801 AD to commemorate his victory over the local Emishi tribes, who had used this cave as a fortification. The temple was described in the Kamakura period chronicle, Azuma Kagami.

The temple has burned down many times and its original form is unknown today; the current building dates from 1961 and was modeled after the famous Kiyomizu-dera in Kyoto.

Takkoku-no-Iwaya was included in the original 2006 nomination of "Hiraizumi - Cultural Landscape Associated with Pure Land Buddhist Cosmology”, but was removed from the nomination after the failure to secure inscription in 2008; although there are continuing efforts to secure its inclusion through future extension.

See also 
List of Historic Sites of Japan (Iwate)
 Historic Monuments and Sites of Hiraizumi

References

 For an explanation of terms concerning Japanese Buddhism, Japanese Buddhist art, and Japanese Buddhist temple architecture, see the Glossary of Japanese Buddhism.

External links 

Iwate Prefectural Tourism Organization
Hiraizumi Touism Association
official home page

Buddhist temples in Iwate Prefecture
Historic Sites of Japan
Hiraizumi, Iwate
9th-century establishments in Japan
Vaiśravaṇa
Tendai temples
Religious buildings and structures completed in 802